Vinícius Goes Barbosa de Souza (born 15 April 1991), known as Vinícius or just Vina, is a Brazilian footballer who plays as an attacking midfielder for Grêmio.

Club career

Paraná
Born in Curitiba, Paraná, Vina graduated with Paraná in 2010. He made his professional debut on 20 July of that year, coming on as a second-half substitute in a 0–3 away loss against Brasiliense. 

Vina scored his first professional goal on 31 July 2010, netting Paraná's third in a 4–0 home routing of Náutico.

Coritiba
On 30 November 2010, Vina moved to cross-town rivals Coritiba, initially assigned to the under-20s. He made his Série A debut on 26 May 2012, coming on as a late substitute in a 2–3 home loss against Botafogo.

Loan deals
Vina was subsequently loaned to Joinville on 29 June 2012, but returned to Coritiba on 9 August. On 7 January 2013, he moved to Londrina also in a temporary deal, but was dismissed in February after an indiscipline problem. 

On 18 February 2013, Vina was loaned to Tupi. He left Coxa in November 2013, with his contract expiring in the following month.

Esportivo and Anápolis
Vina joined Esportivo Bento Gonçalves ahead of the 2014 season, but signed for Anápolis on 17 February of that year. He only played in six matches for each club, before leaving.

Náutico
On 20 March 2014, Vina moved to Série B side Náutico. Mainly a substitute, he featured in 33 league matches and scored five goals as his side avoided relegation, but refused a contract renewal in December.

Fluminense
On 23 December 2014, Vina joined Fluminense after agreeing to a one-year deal. On his top level debut for the club, he scored the winner in a home success against his former club Joinville.

Despite becoming a starter, Vina suffered a foot fracture in June 2015 which kept him out for two months. In November, he was separated from the first team squad after failing to agree a contract renewal, and left Flu in December; he also had altercations with his representative at the time.

Atlético Paranaense
On 18 December 2015, Vina moved to fellow first division side Atlético Paranaense. Initially a starter during the Campeonato Paranaense, he fell down the pecking order before being loaned to Náutico in August.

Loan to Bahia
On 29 May 2017, after spending the first five months of the season separated from Atlético's first team squad, Vinícius joined Bahia still in the top tier, signing until December 2018. He was a regular starter at the club, but his spell was mainly linked to a match against rivals Vitória, where he supposedly celebrated a goal in front of Vitória's supporters, which led to a widespread confusion and nine players being sent off from the match, himself included;

Atlético Mineiro
On 11 January 2019, Vina agreed to a two-year deal with Atlético Mineiro. He featured sparingly and ended the campaign as a backup option.

Ceará
Vina moved to Ceará on a two-year contract on 9 January 2020. He changed his nicknamed throughout the season, being called Vina and becoming a key unit for the club, and scored a career-best 23 goals overall during the 2020 season.

On 17 February 2021, Vina renewed his contract until December 2024. He lost his starting spot under Guto Ferreira during a period of the 2021 campaign, but still ended the season as a starter after regaining his starting spot in August.

In 2022, Vina's form decreased, and he ended the season with more bookable offences (16 yellow cards, two ejections) than goals (12). In October of that year, he was fined after receiving two yellow cards (and being sent off) within three minutes in a 1–1 home draw against Goiás. Ceará also suffered top tier relegation.

Career statistics

Honours
Coritiba
Campeonato Paranaense: 2012

Atlético Paranaense
Campeonato Paranaense: 2016

Bahia
Campeonato Baiano: 2018

Ceará
Copa do Nordeste: 2020

References

External links

1991 births
Living people
Footballers from Curitiba
Brazilian footballers
Association football midfielders
Campeonato Brasileiro Série A players
Campeonato Brasileiro Série B players
Paraná Clube players
Coritiba Foot Ball Club players
Joinville Esporte Clube players
Londrina Esporte Clube players
Tupi Football Club players
Clube Esportivo Bento Gonçalves players
Anápolis Futebol Clube players
Clube Náutico Capibaribe players
Fluminense FC players
Club Athletico Paranaense players
Esporte Clube Bahia players
Clube Atlético Mineiro players
Ceará Sporting Club players
Grêmio Foot-Ball Porto Alegrense players